Sarwe Iyasus, throne name Mehreka Nañ (Ge'ez: ምሕርከ ናኝ), was Emperor of Ethiopia in 1433, and a member of the Solomonic dynasty. He was the older son of Takla Maryam.

According to E. A. Wallis Budge, Sarwe Iyasus ruled for either four or eight months, and died of plague. According to James Bruce, some of the Ethiopian lists of rulers omit his name.

References 

1433 deaths
15th-century deaths from plague (disease)
15th-century monarchs in Africa
15th-century emperors of Ethiopia
Solomonic dynasty
Year of birth unknown